The Tuen Mun Public Library is a public library located at 1 Tuen Hi Road, Tuen Mun, Hong Kong.

The Environmental Protection Department has an air quality monitoring station set up in the Tuen Mun Public Library.

History
The Tuen Mun Public Library opened on December 21, 1989.  At the time, the library was called the Tuen Mun Central Library before its current name was adopted in 2001 to avoid confusion with Hong Kong Central Library.

References

External links

 Tuen Mun Public Library

Public libraries in Hong Kong
Tuen Mun
1989 establishments in Hong Kong
Libraries in Hong Kong
Libraries established in 1989